The state of São Paulo is divided into 63 microregions, grouped into 15 mesoregions:

List
 Adamantina
 Amparo
 Andradina
 Araçatuba
 Araraquara
 Assis
 Auriflama
 Avaré
 Bananal
 Barretos
 Batatais
 Bauru
 Birigüi
 Botucatu
 Bragança Paulista
 Campinas
 Campos do Jordão
 Capão Bonito
 Caraguatatuba
 Catanduva
 Dracena
 Fernandópolis
 Franca
 Franco da Rocha
 Guaratinguetá
 Guarulhos
 Itanhaém
 Itapecerica da Serra
 Itapetininga
 Itapeva
 Ituverava
 Jaboticabal
 Jales
 Jaú
 Jundiaí
 Limeira
 Lins
 Marília
 Mogi das Cruzes
 Moji Mirim
 Nhandeara
 Novo Horizonte
 Osasco
 Ourinhos
 Paraibuna/Paraitinga
 Piedade
 Piracicaba
 Pirassununga
 Presidente Prudente
 Registro
 Ribeirão Preto
 Rio Claro
 Santos
 São Carlos
 São João da Boa Vista
 São Joaquim da Barra
 São José dos Campos
 São José do Rio Preto
 São Paulo
 Sorocaba
 Tatuí
 Tupã
 Votuporanga

References

 
Microregions
Sao Paulo